The WAGR S class was a class of 4-8-2 steam locomotives built by the Midland Railway Workshops between 1943 and 1947 and operated by the Western Australian Government Railways (WAGR).

Details of Design
The S class locomotives were built with a 4-8-2 wheel arrangement, a configuration commonly used in Australia for heavy goods locomotives, smaller driving wheels giving increased tractive effort at the cost of reduced speed.

History

Background
In the 1920s and 1930s the West Australian rail system was thoroughly run down. The vast majority of locomotives were well past their useful service life and many were badly in need of repairs. The P and Pr classes had helped alleviate pressure on aging passenger locomotives when introduced in 1924 and 1938 respectively, but more powerful machines were needed with an order for 10 authorised.

Operational history
The first three were built in 1943, with the remaining seven deferred while Midland Railway Workshops completed its order for 10 Australian Standard Garratts for the Commonwealth Land Transport Board. A further two were completed in 1945, with the remaining five deferred again until 1947 while the Dm and Dd classes were built.

The class was initially intended for service on both passenger and goods services on the Eastern Goldfields Railway between Perth and Kalgoorlie, though following World War II it worked primarily on the South Western Railway. After suffering from a range of early problems (which led to controversy involving the designer Frederick Mills), the class became highly popular and was very successful.

The locomotives were given running-board nameplates and were named after Western Australian mountains, following the tradition established five years earlier with the Pr class, which were named after Western Australian rivers. The locomotives were fitted with steam brakes, the tenders with vacuum brakes. All were fitted with semi-streamlining cowling over the entire length of their tops although this was later removed. The tenders were rebuilt reducing their coal capacity from nine to seven tonnes while increasing their water capacity from 15,900 to 22,700 litres.

Most were condemned in 1971, with S549 operating the last WAGR steam hauled freight service on 24 December 1971.

Preservation
Three have been preserved:
S542 Bakewell is plinthed at East Perth Terminal, once the site of the East Perth Locomotive Depot
S547 Lindsay is preserved on the Bellarine Railway in Victoria
S549 Greenmount is preserved by Rail Heritage WA, restored to working order in 1995

Class list
The numbers, names and periods in service of each member of the S class were as follows:

Namesakes
The S class designation was previously used for the S class locomotives that were withdrawn in 1916. It was reused from 1998 when the Westrail S class diesel locomotives entered service.

See also

Rail transport in Western Australia
List of Western Australian locomotive classes

References

Notes

Bibliography

External links

Railway locomotives introduced in 1943
S WAGR class
3 ft 6 in gauge locomotives of Australia
4-8-2 locomotives
Passenger locomotives